The 2018–19 season was the 87th season in the existence of FC Metz and the club's first season back in the second division of French football. In addition to the domestic league, Metz participated in this season's editions of the Coupe de France and the Coupe de la Ligue.

The club was crowned as champions of the campaign with two games to spare and promoted to the top flight after only one year.

Players

First-team squad

On loan

Pre-season and friendlies

Competitions

Overview

Ligue 2

League table

Results summary

Results by round

Matches
The league fixtures were announced on 7 June 2018.

Coupe de France

Coupe de la Ligue

Statistics

Goalscorers

References

External links

FC Metz seasons
Metz